The B Line, also known as the Northwest Rail Line during construction, is a commuter rail line which is part of the commuter and light rail system operated by the Regional Transportation District in the Denver metropolitan area in Colorado. Part of the FasTracks project, the first  section from downtown Denver to south Westminster opened on July 25, 2016.

Route
The B Line's southern terminus is at Union Station in Denver. It runs on a railroad right-of-way north sharing track with the G Line until Pecos Junction station, after which the two routes diverge. Initially, the B Line continues north to its terminus at Westminster station; this is completed in approximately 15 minutes.

Stations

FasTracks

In 2004, Colorado voters approved FasTracks, a multibillion-dollar public transportation expansion plan. As part of the Eagle P3 project, the first segment of the B Line opened on July 25, 2016. The remaining segment, extending to downtown Longmont, will require additional funding in order to be completed prior to 2042. The announcement angered many voters in the cities and suburbs north of Denver, who had approved a sales tax increase in 2004 to fund the FasTracks project.

The downturn in the economy, poor cost projections that significantly underestimated construction costs and other reasons led to the initiation of the year-long "Northwest Area Mobility Study" for what was then known as the Northwest Rail line. Out of this study came an agreement  between northwest area governments and transportation partners to build a line very different from what the lines voters originally approved. The study concluded in 2014. It made a number of recommendations that were adopted by the RTD.

In summer 2018, the U.S. 36 Mayors and Commissioners Coalition was gathering support from other members to ask RTD to provide an estimate for at least weekday rush hour commuter rail service along the original corridor to Longmont. In spring 2019, Longmont City Council asked RTD to look into the barebones "Peak Service Plan". RTD estimated a start-up cost of $117 million, serving an initial weekday ridership of 1,400. By mid-2019, completion of the full original line was estimated at $1.1-1.5 billion (in 2013 dollars), targeted for 2042, 25 years after the original planned opening. In early 2020, RTD estimated it could construct the rest of the line for peak-direction service at a cost of $700-800 million; full-day service would not be expected until 2050 at a final cost of $1.5 billion.

References

External links

 Official Website

RTD commuter rail
Transportation in Adams County, Colorado
25 kV AC railway electrification
Railway lines opened in 2016